Charles Campbell may refer to:

Politicians
Charles Campbell (member for Campbeltown), Scottish soldier and politician
Charles Campbell (MP for Argyllshire) (c. 1695–1741), Member of Parliament for Argyllshire, 1736–1742
Charles Campbell (New South Wales politician) (1810–1888), Australian politician
Charles Campbell (Queensland politician) (1843–1919), Member of the Queensland Legislative Council
Charles James Campbell (1819–1906), Scottish-born merchant and political figure in Nova Scotia, Canada
Charles Campbell (Hawaii politician) (1918–1986), American educator, civil rights activist and politician from Hawaii

Sportspeople
Charles Campbell (footballer) (1854–1927), Scottish footballer of the 1870s and 1880s
Charles Campbell (British rower) (1805–1851), World Champion sculler
Charles Campbell (Canadian rower) (1914–1963), Canadian Olympic rower
Charles Campbell (sailor) (1881–1948), British Olympic gold medalist in 1908
Charles H. Campbell (1858–1927), American football player, lawyer, and civic leader
Charlie Campbell (Charles Campbell, born 1988), American soccer player
Charlie Campbell (golfer) (1890–?), Australian golfer

Other people
Charles Campbell, 2nd Baron Glenavy (1885–1963), aristocrat
Charles Campbell, 9th Earl of Breadalbane and Holland (1889–1959), Scottish peer and soldier
C. A. Campbell (Charles Arthur Campbell, 1897–1974), Scottish metaphysical philosopher
Charles Augustus Rosenheimer Campbell (1863–1931), president of the San Antonio Academy of Medicine, proponent of bats for mosquito control
Charles C. Campbell (general) (1948–2016), U.S. Army general and FORSCOM commander
Charles C. Campbell (voice actor) (born 1968), voice actor
Charles James Fox Campbell (1811–1859), early settler of Adelaide, South Australia
Charles Gordon Campbell (1840–1905), Australian merchant and pastoralist
Charles L. Campbell (1930–2013), American sound engineer
Charles Macfie Campbell (1876–1943), American psychiatrist
Charles Muir Campbell (1795–1874), initial subscriber to American Colonization Society
Charles Rodman Campbell (1954–1994), executed convict
Charles Sandwith Campbell (1858–1923), Canadian philanthropist and governor of McGill University
Charles Thomas Campbell (1823–1895), American soldier, served as a Union Army general during the Civil War

Chuck Campbell (Charles Campbell, born 1969), Canadian comedian and actor
Chuckie Campbell (Charles Edward Campbell, born 1981), American musician, poet, fiction writer, editor, publisher, and educator

Other
Charles Campbell College